Frederick Bracegirdle (24 June 1885 – 5 August 1948) was a British sports shooter. He competed in the 50 m rifle event at the 1924 Summer Olympics.

References

External links
 

1885 births
1948 deaths
British male sport shooters
Olympic shooters of Great Britain
Shooters at the 1924 Summer Olympics
Sportspeople from Derby